Yasodara Devi Balika Maha Vidyalaya is a girls' school located in Gampaha district in Sri Lanka.

References

Girls' schools in Sri Lanka
National schools in Sri Lanka
Schools in Gampaha